Tuksanbayevo (Tuqhanbay) is a rural locality (a village) in Yenebey-Ursayevsky Selsoviet, Miyakinsky District, Bashkortostan, Russia. The population was 128 as of 2010. There are 4 streets.

Geography 
Tuksanbayevo is located 41 km southwest of Kirgiz-Miyaki (the district's administrative centre) by road. Safarovo is the nearest rural locality.

References 

Rural localities in Miyakinsky District